Kandy is a city in the centre of Sri Lanka.

It may also refer to:

Places
 Kingdom of Kandy, an independent monarchy on Sri Lanka between the 15th and 19th centuries
 Kandy District, a district of Sri Lanka
 Kandy Electoral District
 Kandy Electoral District (1947–1989)
 Kandy Lake
 Roman Catholic Diocese of Kandy

People
 Kandy Fong, fan video creator credited with creating the concept of mash-ups
 Kandy Ho, Puerto Rican drag queen
 Kandy Muse, Afro-Dominican American drag queen
 Kandy Nehova (born 1946), Namibian politician
 Kandy Tamer, Australian-born former rugby league player in Lebanon
 Kandy Wong (born 1987), Hong Kong singer and actor

Other uses
 Kandy.io, a communications platform as a service (PaaS) created by GENBAND in 2014
 Kandy (horse) (foaled 1929–after 1943), French Thoroughbred racehorse and broodmare

See also
 Candi (disambiguation)
 Candy (disambiguation)
 Kandi (disambiguation)
 Kandys, a Persian garment